Rodina Stadium is a football stadium in Khimki, Russia. The stadium is owned by FC Khimki.

See also
Other stadiums in Khimki:
 Arena Khimki
 Novye Khimki Stadium

References

Football venues in Russia
Sport in Moscow Oblast
FC Khimki
Buildings and structures in Moscow Oblast
Khimki
2007 establishments in Russia
Sports venues completed in 2007